Arinthum Ariyamalum is a 2005 Indian Tamil-language crime action film written and directed by Vishnuvardhan. It stars Navdeep, Prakash Raj, and newcomers Arya and Sameksha, while Adithya, Sangili Murugan, Krishna, and Yog Japee play pivotal roles. The film's music was composed by Yuvan Shankar Raja.  "Punnagai Poo"  Gheetha, a RJ at a Malaysian radio station THR Raaga, produced the film.

The film was released theatrically on 20 May 2005. It completed a 175-day run at the box office. The film eventually went on to receive Filmfare Award for Best Male Debut – South for Arya. In 2015, the film was released on Blu-ray in the UK.

Plot 

Satya, an innocent Brahmin boy, comes from Nagercoil to Chennai, to join an engineering college. His problems begin, one by one, when he encounters his father, the dreaded don, Adhi Narayanan, and the latter's hot-blooded adopted son, Kutty. Satya's girlfriend, Sandhya, is accidentally wounded in a shootout between Adhi's gang and his rivals. Satya, on the prodding of ACP Thiagarajan, is all set to identify Kutty as the culprit. Intimidated and threatened by the gang and in a state of confusion, Satya is shocked, when Adhi suddenly changes track and makes friendly overtures to him, claiming kinship with him. With Kutty too going overboard with his brotherly overprotective attitude, Satya's life takes a comical and drastic turn.

Cast

Soundtrack 
The soundtrack and film score were composed by Yuvan Shankar Raja, joining again with the director Vishnuvardhan after Kurumbu (2003). The soundtrack was released on 10 April 2005 and featured five tracks with lyrics penned by Pa. Vijay and Snehan. Yuvan Shankar Raja garnered high praise for the "racy" and "peppy songs", the album becoming one of the most successful albums of 2005, while Behindwoods placed "Yuvan's music in Arindhum Ariyamalum" on the fifth spot in the list of Top 5 Innovations of the year in Tamil cinema. The album features the singers Mahua Kamat and Anushka Manchanda, former members of the girl group Viva!, foraying into the Tamil Music industry.

The song "Theepidika", in particular, gained cult status, becoming the "anthem of the season". It incorporates elements of the song "Bhoomiyil Maanida Jenmam" from the 1941 Tamil film Ashok Kumar, featuring the voice of M. K. Thyagaraja Bhagavathar; composed by Papanasam Sivan.

Reception
Sify wrote that "The highlight of the film is that it is racy and the casting is perfect. The designer look, comic one-liners and great action scenes makes the film watchable. The sentimental happy ending contributes considerably towards tugging at the heartstrings. Prakash Raj, clearly having a Ghilli hangover is extraordinary". Behindwoods stated that "Director Vishnuvardhan has woven a good screenplay which shifts from romance to action and to a tale of father-son bonding but laced with humour". Kalki rated the film "above average". The Hindu wrote, "Sometimes striking a serious note, suddenly lending it a comic twist and eventually wrapping it all up in absolute bonhomie, writer-director Vishnuvardhan's palatable treatment is a pleasant surprise".

References

External links 
 

2000s crime action films
2000s Tamil-language films
2005 action films
2000s crime films
2005 films
Films directed by Vishnuvardhan (director)
Films scored by Yuvan Shankar Raja
Indian crime action films